Amphirhina are animals, a phylogenetic classification within the subphylum vertebrata. They are more commonly known as the Branch Gnathostomata, and are described as having double nasal chambers, or nostrils, and jaws. The parallel branch in this naming system is Monorhina (more commonly Agnatha), which possess a single nostril and a circular mouth without jaws. The ears of all animals within Amphirhina possess three semicircular canals.

References

Vertebrate taxonomy